Naked is the debut studio album by English new wave and synth-pop band Kissing the Pink, released on 27 May 1983 by Magnet Records. The album peaked at No. 54 on the UK Albums Chart in June 1983, and produced their Top 20 hit "The Last Film". The song was their best performing single in the UK, and the only one to break the top 75. It is their only album to feature singer Sylvia Griffin who left the band before the album was completed.

32 years after its original release, Naked was reissued in 2015 as a remastered special edition CD by Cherry Red, which includes the 12 original album tracks plus seven related bonus tracks all sourced from the original master tapes.

Track listing

Personnel
Credits are adapted from the Naked liner notes.

Kissing the Pink
 Nicholas Whitecross – guitar; vocals
 Jon Kingsley Hall – keyboards; synthesizer; vocals
 George Stewart – keyboards; vocals
 Josephine Wells – saxophone; vocals
 Stevie Cusack –  drums; percussion; vocals
 Peter Barnett – bass; violin; vocals
 Sylvia Griffin – vocals (uncredited)

Production and artwork
 Colin Thurston – producer
 Peter Walsh – producer
 Neil Richmond – producer
 David King – producer
 Kissing the Pink – producer
 Tim Barnett – front cover painting
 Shoot That Tiger! – art direction; design

Chart performance

References

External links
 

1983 albums
Kissing the Pink albums